Women Prison is a Hong Kong film made by Media Asia Entertainment Group in 1988. The film is directed by David Lam.

Cast
Fung Bo Bo as A qin
Charine Chan as Xiaomin
Elsie Chan as Mui Kwai Nui
Lo Fun as Shandong po
Maria Cordero as cai guniang
Simon Yam as Liu Weiliang
Ha Chi-chun as Zhu Jingjing
Patricia Ha as He Jiahui
Carol Cheng as Li Yulian

References

External links

1980s crime thriller films
1980s prison films
Films directed by David Lam
Films set in Hong Kong
Hong Kong prison films
Women in prison films
1980s Hong Kong films